Pont-de-Buis-lès-Quimerch is a commune in the Finistère department of Brittany in north-western France. The commune was created in 1949 under the name Pont-de-Buis from parts of Quimerch and Saint-Ségal. In 1965 it absorbed the former communes Logonna-Quimerch and Quimerch, and its name was changed to Pont-de-Buis-lès-Quimerch.

Population
Inhabitants of Pont-de-Buis-lès-Quimerch are called in French Pontdebuisiens.

See also
Communes of the Finistère department
Parc naturel régional d'Armorique

References

External links

Mayors of Finistère Association 

Communes of Finistère